Simon Pearson (born 8 May 1982) is a former English cricketer. Pearson was a left-handed batsman who bowled leg break.

Pearson made his debut for the Leicestershire Cricket Board in 1999 against Oxfordshire in the MCCA Knockout Trophy. He played one further MCCA Knockout Trophy match in 2001 against the Northamptonshire Cricket Board.

Pearson represented the Leicestershire Cricket Board in a single List A match against the Warwickshire Cricket Board in the 2001 Cheltenham & Gloucester Trophy. In his only List A match he scored 12 runs.

References

External links
Simon Pearson at Cricinfo
Simon Pearson at CricketArchive

1982 births
Living people
English cricketers
Leicestershire Cricket Board cricketers